Rajella lintea is a species of fish belonging to the family Rajidae.

It is native to the coasts of Northern Atlantic Ocean.

Synonym:
 Dipturus linteus (Fries, 1838)

References

"Rajella lintea".IUCN Red List of Threatened Species.2020

lintea